Aristotelia australasica, the mountain wineberry, is a shrub in the family Elaeocarpaceae. It grows in or near cool rainforest areas in northern New South Wales, Australia.

References

australasica
Flora of New South Wales
Taxa named by Ferdinand von Mueller